Mind how you go may refer to:
Mind How You Go (The Advisory Circle album), 2005
Mind How You Go (Skye Edwards album), 2006
"Mind How You Go", a 1965 single by Barry St. John (Elizabeth Thompson)
"Mind How You Go", a 1967 single by Allan Smethurst
"Mind How You Go", a 1966 single by Mr. Lee Grant (Bogdan Kominowski)